Tillandsia guenther-nolleri is a species of flowering plant in the genus Tillandsia. This species is endemic to Mexico.

References

guenther-nolleri
Flora of Mexico